Delta Heritage Trail State Park is a  Arkansas state park in Arkansas, Desha, and Phillips counties, Arkansas in the United States. A rails to trails conversion planned along  of abandoned Union Pacific right of way, the Delta Heritage Trail currently runs  from Lexa to Barton. Acquisition of the abandoned corridor was aided by the National Trails System Act, and the beginnings of the trail through Delta lowlands was dedicated in 2002.

See also
 Yancopin Bridge
 Watson, Arkansas

References

State parks of Arkansas
Protected areas of Arkansas County, Arkansas
Protected areas of Desha County, Arkansas
Protected areas of Phillips County, Arkansas
Protected areas established in 2002
Rail trails in Arkansas
2002 establishments in Arkansas
Heritage trails